Christopher E. Kubasik is chair, and chief executive officer of L3Harris Technologies, a provider of global ISR, communications and networked systems, and electronic systems for military, homeland security and commercial aviation customers. In this position, he is responsible for leading the execution of L3Harris's strategic growth objectives.

Biography

Career
Kubasik joined L3 Technologies in October 2015.  On July 19, 2017, the L3 Board elected Kubasik to the position of CEO and president, and to the Board of Directors effective January 1, 2018. When L3 merged with Harris Corporation in 2019 to form L3Harris Technologies, Kubasik was president and chief operating officer of the new company. He was appointed chief executive officer in June 2021 and was appointed as chair in June 2022.

Prior to joining L3, Kubasik was president and COO of Lockheed Martin Corporation. While in that role, an ethics investigation confirmed that Chris had a long-term extramarital affair with a subordinate employee, and on November 9, 2012, Bob Stevens, chairman and CEO, asked for and received Chris Kubasik's resignation.

Education
Kubasik earned his bachelor's degree (Magna Cum Laude) in accounting from the University of Maryland's School of Business in 1983.  In 1997, he attended the Executive Program at Northwestern University’s Kellogg School of Management. In 2004, he completed the Systems Acquisition Management Course for Flag Officers at the Defense Acquisition University, Fort Belvoir.  He is also a Certified Public Accountant.

References 

Businesspeople in aviation
University of Maryland, College Park alumni
Kellogg School of Management alumni
Defense Acquisition University alumni
American business executives
American chief operating officers
Living people
Year of birth missing (living people)
L3Harris Technologies
Ernst & Young people